Saint Anthony's Church is a Roman Catholic religious complex on Picacho Street in Casa Grande, Arizona. The church, along with the associated rectory, was listed in the National Register of Historic Places in 1985.

The church is built of adobe covered with stucco and has Spanish Colonial Revival influence. It was built in 1935.  The north corner of its front facade has a bell tower surmounted by a small cross.

The rectory was built in 1936, and also is of Spanish Colonial Revival influence.  Its interior has a large  open beamed ceiling.

The church or the rectory is also known as Murphy Hall.

See also
 List of historic properties in Casa Grande, Arizona

References

Churches on the National Register of Historic Places in Arizona
Roman Catholic churches completed in 1935
Roman Catholic churches in Arizona
Catholic Church in Arizona
Churches in Casa Grande, Arizona
National Register of Historic Places in Pinal County, Arizona
20th-century Roman Catholic church buildings in the United States